"Avengers, assemble!" is the rallying cry for the Marvel Comics superhero team the Avengers, as well as its Marvel Cinematic Universe counterpart.

Avengers Assemble may also refer to:
The Avengers (2012 film), a 2012 superhero film titled Marvel Avengers Assemble in the United Kingdom and Ireland
The Avengers (soundtrack), the soundtrack for the 2012 film The Avengers
Avengers Assemble (comics), a Marvel Comics title launched in March 2012
Avengers Assemble (TV series), a 2013 animated TV series that aired on Disney XD
Avengers Assemble, a combine volume title of Avengers (1998) #1-11 and Annual '98.
Avengers Assemble, the cover title of Avengers (2018) #63.
"Avengers Assemble", the two-part premiere episode of the 1999 animated series The Avengers: United They Stand
"Avengers Assemble!", the final episode of the 2010 animated series The Avengers: Earth's Mightiest Heroes!